Joshua Blue is  a project under development by IBM that focuses on advancing the artificial intelligence field by designing and programming computers to emulate human mental functions.

Goals
According to researchers at IBM's Thomas J. Watson Research Center, the main goal of Joshua Blue is "to achieve cognitive flexibility that approaches human functioning". In short, IBM is aiming to design Joshua Blue to 'think like a human', mainly in terms of emotional thought; similar IBM projects focusing on logical thought and strategic reasoning include Deep Blue, a logic-based chess-playing computer, and Watson, a question-driven artificial intelligence software program. Currently, the vast majority of computers and computational systems run off of an input-output model; some sort of input is entered in and some output is given back. Through Project Joshua Blue, IBM hopes to develop computers to the point where they are asking questions and searching for answers themselves rather than relying on an external input to run or only crunching numbers to give a pre-programmed response once given a task. If they succeed in this task, the artificial intelligence knowledge gained from Project Joshua Blue could potentially be used to create social robots that work and act very much as humans do. These robots could take over tasks too dangerous for humans to engage in even if such tasks required many different decisions to be made along the way; the technological advancement gained through Joshua Blue's potential success would allow for the robots to think for themselves and work their way through problems just as humans do.

How it will work
A model of Joshua Blue's learning pattern has been created. Similar to how young children learn human traits through interacting with their surroundings, Joshua Blue will acquire knowledge through external stimuli present in its environment. IBM believes that if computers evolve to learn in this way and then comprehend and analyze the knowledge gained using reason, computers could begin to possess a "mind", of sorts, capable of demonstrating complex social behaviors similar to those of humans.

Most likely done as a precaution to avoid theft of their ideas, IBM has not released any significant information regarding how Joshua Blue will physically gather information. Thus far, IBM has revealed that Joshua Blue will be a computer with a network of wires and input nodes that function as a computer nervous system. This nervous system will be used by Joshua Blue to perceive affect or personal emotional feelings. Not only will this network of input nodes help Joshua Blue discover things physically, but it will also allow Joshua Blue to interpret the significance of events. The input nodes, or proprioceptors, will enable Joshua Blue to be aware of things that happen around itself, as well as recognize and attach meaning to the emotional effect produced by interacting with an object in a certain way. In addition, Joshua Blue's proprioceptors will function as pain and pleasure sensors, allowing Joshua Blue to employ a similar "reward and punishment" system that humans use to form behaviors. This will eventually lead Joshua Blue to expect certain outcomes from acting, reacting, or interacting in certain ways, eventually leading to the development of behavioral patterns which IBM hopes to study in order to further bridge the gap between human mental functions and computer functions.

Related projects
Through three of their projects (Deep Blue, Watson, and Joshua Blue), IBM is attempting to create computers that imitate the common functions of the human brain.

References

See also 
 Blue Brain Project
 Simulated reality

AI software
Joshua Blue